Linn of Muick is a waterfall on the river Muick, Aberdeenshire, Scotland.

See also
Waterfalls of Scotland

References

Waterfalls of Aberdeenshire